Lesley is a placename, given name and surname, a variant of Leslie that can be male or female name and is ultimately an anglicization of a Scottish (Gaelic) placename.

Places
 Fort Lesley J. McNair, American army facility
 Lesley University, American academic institution
 Lesley, Western Australia, a suburb of Perth

People

Given name
 Lesley Baker (b. 1944), Australian actress
 Lesley Bamberger (born 1965/1966), Dutch billionaire, owner of Kroonenberg Groep
 Lesley Blanch (1904–2007), British writer and editor
 Lesley M. M. Blume, American author
 Lesley Turner Bowrey (b. 1942), Australian tennis player
 Lesley-Ann Brandt (b. 1981), South African-born actress
 Lesley Choyce (b. 1951), American-born writer based in Canada
 Lesley Douglas (b. 1963), British radio executive
 Lesley-Anne Down (b. 1954), British actress
 Lesley Ann Downey (1954–1964), British murder victim
 Lesley Duncan (1943–2010), British singer-songwriter
 Lesley Dunlop (b. 1956), British actress
 Lesley Elliott (disambiguation), multiple people
 Lesley Garrett (b. 1955), British soprano
 Lesley Gill,  American anthropology professor
 Lesley Gore (1946–2015), American singer-songwriter
 Lesley Hawker (b. 1981), Canadian figure skater
 Lesley Head, Australian geographer
 Lesley Hinds (b. 1956), Lord Provost of Edinburgh, Scotland
 Twiggy (born Lesley Hornby, 1949), British model and actress
 Lesley Joseph (b. 1945), British actress
 Lesley Judd (b. 1946), British actress
 Lesley Langley (b. 1944/5), Miss World 1965 from Britain
 Lesley Magnus (b. 1977), Canadian field hockey player
 Lesley Manville (b. 1956), British actress
 Lesley J. McNair (1883–1944), American military officer
 Lesley Mahmood (b. 1942), British politician
 Lesley Molseed (1964–1975), British murder victim
 Lesley Jean Murdoch (b. 1956), New Zealand cricketer
 Lesley Rumball (b. 1973), New Zealand netball player
 Lesley Sanderson (b. 1985/6), contestant on the British Big Brother TV series
 Lesley Scott, contributing writer to Doctor Who
 Lesley Sharp (b. 1964), British actress
 Lesley Soper (b. 1954), New Zealand politician
 Lesley Stahl (b. 1941), American broadcast journalist
 Lesley Vainikolo (b. 1979), New Zealand rugby player
 Lesley Visser (b. 1953), American sports broadcaster
 Lesley Ward, Australian mathematician
 Lesley Ann Warren (b. 1946), American actress
 Lesley Waters (b. 1960), British celebrity chef
 Lesley Whittle (1957–1975), British murder victim

Surname
 Brad Lesley (1958–2013), American baseball player
 Caroline Lesley (b. 1978), Canadian actress
 John Lesley (1527–1596), Scottish bishop and historian
 Peter Lesley (1819–1903), American geologist

Fictional characters
 Lesley May, character in the novel series Rivers of London
 Lesley Smiles, character in the animated television series CJ the DJ
 Lesley Webber, character in American soap opera General Hospital
 Lesley, playable character in the mobile game Mobile Legends: Bang Bang

See also
 "Lesley", a song by Dave from Psychodrama
 
 Leslie (disambiguation)

Scottish given names
Scottish masculine given names
Scottish feminine given names
English unisex given names
English-language unisex given names